The Penguin Football Club is an Australian rules football club based in Penguin, Tasmania. It was founded in 1890.

Penguin currently competes in the North West Football League (NWFL), previously known as the "Northern Tasmanian Football League". It previously competed in the North West Football Union (NWFU).

The current coach of Penguin is former Australian Football League (AFL) player Maverick Weller.

Notable former players 
 Andrew Lee
 Stephen Milne 
 Brad Sewell 
 Lenny Hayes
 Anthony Koutoufides
 Michael O'Loughlin 
 Fred Wooller 
 Tim Evans 
 Justin Plapp 
Tom Fitzmaurice
Michael Gale
Amir Aboubakr Sultan

References

External links
Official website

Australian rules football clubs in Tasmania
1890 establishments in Australia
Australian rules football clubs established in 1890
North West Football League clubs